Diego Ivo Pires (born 6 April 1989) is a Brazilian footballer who plays as a central defender for Remo.

Honours
Avaí
Campeonato Catarinense: 2010

Ceará
Campeonato Cearense: 2013, 2014

Moreirense
Taça da Liga: 2016–17

Paysandu
Copa Verde: 2018

References

External links

1989 births
Living people
Sportspeople from Bahia
Brazilian footballers
Brazilian expatriate footballers
Association football central defenders
Campeonato Brasileiro Série A players
Campeonato Brasileiro Série B players
Campeonato Brasileiro Série C players
Primeira Liga players
Associação Atlética Iguaçu players
Avaí FC players
Sport Club Barueri players
Paulista Futebol Clube players
Sport Club do Recife players
Club Athletico Paranaense players
Ceará Sporting Club players
Associação Atlética Ponte Preta players
São Bernardo Futebol Clube players
Moreirense F.C. players
Paysandu Sport Club players
Esporte Clube São Bento players
Esporte Clube Juventude players
Esporte Clube Novo Hamburgo players
Clube de Regatas Brasil players
Brazilian expatriate sportspeople in Portugal
Expatriate footballers in Portugal